Wind Quintet IV (1984–85) is George Perle's (1915–2009) fourth wind quintet. He was awarded the 1986 Pulitzer Prize for Music and a MacArthur Fellowship for the piece.

It was commissioned by the Dorian Wind Quintet, who gave the first performance of the work at Merkin Concert Hall on October 2, 1985.

Structure
The work is in four Movements:

Invention
Scherzo
Pastorale
Finale

Sources

Further reading
Rosenhaus, Steven L. (1995). "Harmonic Motion in George Perle's Wind Quintet No. 4," Ph.D. dissertation, School of Education, New York University. Cited in Perle, George (1996). Twelve-tone tonality, p.xv. .

External links
"George Perle Excerpt", DorianWindQuintet.org.

Compositions by George Perle
Perle 4
1985 compositions
Pulitzer Prize for Music-winning works